Michigan Proposal 04-2 of 2004, is an amendment to the Michigan Constitution that made it unconstitutional for the state to recognize or perform same-sex marriages or civil unions.  The referendum was approved by 59% of the voters. The amendment faced multiple legal challenges and was finally overturned in Obergefell v. Hodges by the U.S. Supreme Court.

Contents

The text of the amendment states:

Results

Aftermath
In May 2008, the Michigan Supreme Court held that the amendment bans not only same-sex marriage and civil unions, but also public employee domestic partnership benefits such as health insurance. However, the ruling had little effect since most public employers relaxed their eligibility criteria to not run afoul of the amendment.  On June 28, 2013, U.S. District Judge David M. Lawson issued a preliminary injunction blocking the state from enforcing its law banning local governments and school districts from offering health benefits to their employees' domestic partners. He wrote: "It is hard to argue with a straight face that the primary purpose—indeed, perhaps the sole purpose—of the statute is other than to deny health benefits to the same-sex partners of public employees. But that can never be a legitimate governmental purpose". He rejected the state's arguments that "fiscal responsibility" was the law's rationale.

On March 21, 2014, a federal judge ruled that Michigan's ban on same-sex marriage is unconstitutional and did not stay the ruling, although the ruling was later suspended.

On November 6, 2014, the United States Court of Appeals for the Sixth Circuit overturned the lower court in DeBoer v. Snyder declaring that:

 When the courts do not let the people resolve new social issues like this one, they perpetuate the idea that the heroes in
these change events are judges and lawyers. Better in this instance, we think, to allow change through the customary political processes, in which the people, gay and straight alike, become the heroes of their own stories by meeting each other not as adversaries in a court system but as fellow citizens seeking to resolve a new social issue in a fair-minded way. For these reasons, we reverse.

On January 16, 2015, the U.S. Supreme Court granted certiorari to the same-sex marriage cases arising out of the United States Court of Appeals for the Sixth Circuit. Oral arguments were held on April 28, 2015 and a ruling was made on June 26, 2015 allowing same-sex marriage in every state.

See also 
Civil union in the United States
Domestic partnership in the United States
LGBT rights in Michigan
Same-sex marriage in Michigan
Same-sex marriage in the United States

References

External links
 The Money Behind the 2004 Marriage Amendments -- National Institute on Money in State Politics

U.S. state constitutional amendments banning same-sex unions
2004 in LGBT history
LGBT rights in Michigan
Michigan Proposal 2
Michigan ballot proposals
Same-sex marriage ballot measures in the United States
Proposal 2